Sean MacKenzie Bridgers (born March 15, 1968) is an American actor, screenwriter, and producer, known for his role as Johnny Burns on the HBO series Deadwood and on the SundanceTV original series Rectify as Trey Willis. Additional to many roles in television and film since 1991, Bridgers received acclaim and awards for the independent film Paradise Falls, which he wrote and produced.

He received praise for his lead role in Lucky McKee's horror film The Woman and another Moderncine film, Jug Face, as well as notable roles in Sweet Home Alabama and Nell. He played Old Nick in the 2015 film Room.

Personal life
Bridgers was born in 1968 in Chapel Hill, North Carolina, to Ben and Sue Ellen Bridgers. Ben was the tribal attorney for the Cherokee Indian tribe and published a memoir and books of poetry. Sue Ellen Bridgers is a novelist with seven published novels.

He graduated from St. Andrew's-Sewanee School and Western Carolina University. In interviews, Bridgers has mentioned that as a screenwriter he is influenced by his favorite author Mark Twain and developed an interest in acting after seeing Robert Duvall in Tender Mercies at age 14. Bridgers started watching everything by Tender Mercies screenwriter Horton Foote, and Duvall and Foote became his biggest creative influences.

Sean Bridgers's children are also actors. His son, Jackson, has acted in roles on Justified and Deadwood, as well as his daughter, Kate, who starred in Bridgers' 2012 short, The Birthday Present.

Recent productions

Acting
Bridgers has received praise for a diversity of roles in both film and television, including his role as Johnny Burns on HBO's Deadwood, and his role as the father in Lucky McKee's feature film The Woman. His co-starring role in the southern-horror film, from writer/director Chad Crawford Kinkle's Slamdance award-winning screenplay, Jug Face, released by the studio Moderncine, was another performance in the horror genre. Bridgers received praise for his performance from FEARnet, Dread Central, Birth.Movies.Death, and Starburst Magazine critics, among others.

Bridgers has also received acclaim for his role as Trey Willis on Rectify, particularly in one of the series' most notable episodes in Season 3. Reviewer Nick Hogan wrote, "this was one of the most gut-wrenching episodes of Rectify in some time. Mostly because Sean Bridgers does a masterful job portraying Trey..." Mark Walker wrote in The Copenhagen Post that Bridgers's performance as Old Nick in Room was "brilliantly restrained". Bridgers also stars in the critically acclaimed Epix show Get Shorty.

Writing/directing
Bridgers, along with his producing and directing partner, Michael "Ffish" Hemschoot, have been developing a dark western, noted as a "Faustian western" that takes place in the South during the Civil War titled Arkansas Traveler. Bridgers wrote the original screenplay and is a principal in the production company Travelin' Productions with Hemschoot, producing and shooting a trailer of the film featuring a cast including Garret Dillahunt and Angela Bettis. The resulting production was also released online as a Web series of the same name in June 2017.

Actor and filmmaker Ray McKinnon commented on Bridgers's screenplay: Arkansas Traveler is one of the best un-produced scripts I have read in the last decade, it's not just the complex, larger narrative of the end of the Civil War and the amazing backdrop of the protagonist's travels, but Arkansas Traveler offers the continual smaller surprises of behavior and plot – of man's inhumanity to man [and woman and child and beast] and his infinite humanity. It's universal and timeless and must get made.

Bridgers and Hemschoot, under their production companies Travelin' Productions and Colorado animation studio Worker Studio are also developing an animated documentary about decorated World War II pilot John H. Ross.

Filmography

Film

Television

Videogames

References

External links

Travelin' Productions Official Website, travelinproductions.com
Interview with Sean Bridgers, bloody-disgusting.com

1968 births
Living people
Male actors from North Carolina
People from Chapel Hill, North Carolina
Western Carolina University alumni
American male television actors
American male film actors
American male web series actors
Web series directors
Web series producers
20th-century American male actors
21st-century American male actors